Alma's Way is an animated children's television series from Fred Rogers Productions created and executive produced by former Sesame Street actress Sonia Manzano and animated by Canadian animation studio Pipeline Studios. It premiered on PBS and PBS Kids on October 4, 2021.

The show is set in The Bronx, New York and revolves around Alma, a six-year-old Puerto Rican girl, as she ventures out into her Latino neighborhood to demonstrate decision making and social awareness skills. The title's meaning refers to Alma's ability of thinking things through, to help her solve problems within each episode.

Starting from the show's premiere, television airings are followed up by Jelly, Ben and Pogo, which are shorts that focus on Filipino culture. On November 1, 2022, it was replaced by Molly of Denali: The Big Gathering, which are shorts based on Molly of Denali.

On December 26, 2022, television airings are also followed up by City Island, which are shorts regarding sentient objects, homes, and vehicles.

On August 2, 2022, it was announced the series was renewed for a second season which will air in fall 2023.

Plot
Alma Rivera is a six-year old young girl who lives in the Bronx with her family and friends. She faces lots of problems every day, and always stops, listens, looks, thinks, and explains to help her solve everyday problems.

Cast and characters

The Rivera family
 Alma Rivera - (voiced by Summer Rose Castillo), a curious 6-year-old girl who likes solving problems. Her favorite baseball team is the Sweat Sox. She has brown eyes, light-brown-skin, and possesses brown hair in a curly ponytail, wears two golden earrings, a blue jean vest over a pink t-shirt, lavender leggings under a dark-blue skirt, and light-brown boots.
 Junior Rivera (voiced by Neo Vela), Alma's 5-year-old younger brother who loves dinosaurs and to dance. His favorite singer is Elyssa B, and his favorite baseball team is the City Seagulls. He has short brown hair, light-brown skin, and wears a blue and yellow t-shirt, grey pants, and orange sneakers.
 Lulú "Mami" Rivera (voiced by Annie Henk), Alma and Junior's mother, and Ruben's wife. She is a musician and music teacher. She is a great cook, but isn't good at making mofongo. Her favorite singer is Elyssa B.
 Ruben "Papi" Rivera (voiced by Jesús E. Martinez), Alma and Junior's father, and Lulú's husband. He is a veterinarian, and hosts his own show called Ruben to the Rescue. His favorite baseball team is the City Seagulls.
 Abuelo Rivera (voiced by Danny Bolero), Lulú and Gloria's father, and Alma, Junior and Eddie's maternal grandfather.

Supporting
 Eddie Mambo (voiced by Jacob Crespo), Alma's next door neighbor and cousin. He is a gifted musician who plays drums, guitar and horn.
 Uncle Nestor (voiced by Marco Antonio Rodriguez), Alma's uncle and Eddie's father. He is a playwright and musical director of a Bomba ensemble.
 Tía Gloria (voiced by Sharon Montero), Alma's aunt and Eddie's mother. She is a New York City Transit Authority Train Conductor.
 André King (voiced by Niason DaCosta), Alma's friend. He is great at drawing and sketching.
 Rafia Huda (voiced by Naysa Nishash Shokeen), Alma and André's Bangladeshi friend. She loves to play sports.
 Lucas Reed (voiced by Julian Lerner), Alma, André and Rafia's friend. He is a gifted singer.
 Becka (voiced by Emily Isabel), a keyboard player and of Jewish descent.
 Safina Huda (voiced by Jenna Qureshi), Rafia's older sister. She volunteers at Ruben's pet clinic.
 Owen Reed (voiced by Andy Talen), Lucas's father.
 Anik Huda (voiced by Ratnesh Dubey), Rafia and Safina's father. He owns a small grocery store.
 Nea King (voiced by Justine J. Hall), André's mother. She owns a bookstore.
 Frankie Four Feet (voiced by Victor Cruz), owner of the Bronx Community Center.
 Granny Isa (voiced by Sonia Manzano), Alma's maternal grandmother who travels the world.

Jelly, Ben and Pogo
 Jelly (voiced by Vanille Velasquez), an optimistic Filipino-American girl. She seems to role as the leader of the group.
 Ben (voiced by Jalysa Leva), Jelly's little brother who serves as the smallest and youngest of the trio.
 Pogo (voiced by Christina Sivrich), the kids' green quadrupedal Ogopogo-like sea creature friend.

Episodes

Reception 
Adiba Nelson of The Washington Post wrote, "Afro-Latino children finally have characters they can relate to."

References

External links

2020s American children's television series
2020s American animated television series
2020s Canadian children's television series
2020s Canadian animated television series
2021 American television series debuts
2021 Canadian television series debuts
2020s preschool education television series
American children's animated television series
American preschool education television series
Canadian children's animated television series
Canadian preschool education television series
Animated preschool education television series
Hispanic and Latino American television
English-language education television programming
Spanish-language education television programming
Fred Rogers
PBS original programming
PBS Kids shows
Animated television series about children
Animated television series about siblings
Animated television series about families
Disability in television
Television shows set in the Bronx
Television series impacted by the COVID-19 pandemic